Bullioh is a locality in north east Victoria, Australia.
 

References

External links

Towns in Victoria (Australia)
Shire of Towong